The Max Planck Institute for Biogeochemistry is located in Jena, Germany. It was created in 1997, and moved into new buildings 2002. It is one of 80 institute in the Max Planck Society (Max Planck Gesellschaft).

Departments and research groups 

Biogeochemical Processes (Susan E. Trumbore)
Molecular Biogeochemistry (Gerd Gleixner)
Theoretical Ecosystem Ecology (Carlos A. Sierra)
Soil Biogeochemistry (Marion Schrumpf)
Plant Allocation (Henrik Hartmann)
Landscape Proceesses (Shaun Levick)
Emeritus Group (Ernst Detlef Schulze)
Tanguro Flux (Susan E. Trumbore)
Biogeochemical Integration (Markus Reichstein)
Biosphere-Atmosphere Interactions and Experimentation (Mirco Migliavacca)
Terrestrial Biosphere Modelling (Sönke Zaehle)
Model-Data Integration (Nuno Carvalhais)
Global Diagnostic Modelling (Miguel D. Mahecha)
Empirical Inference of the Earth System  (Martin Jung)
Flora Incognita (Jana Wäldchen)
Hydrology-Biosphere-Climate Interactions (René Orth)
Biogeochemical Systems (Martin Heiman, emeritus)
Atmospheric Remote Sensing (ARS) (Dietrich Feist)
Airborne trace gas measurements and mesoscale modelling (ATM) (Christoph Gerbig)
Inverse data-driven estimation (IDE) (Christian Rödenbeck)
Integrating surface-atmosphere Exchange Processes Across Scales - Modeling and Monitoring (IPAS) (Mathias Goeckede)
Tall Tower Atmospheric Gas Measurements (TAG) (Jošt Valentin Lavrič)
Carbon Cycle Data Assimilation (CCDAS) (Sönke Zaehle)
Satellite-based remote sensing of greenhouse gases (SRS) (Julia Marshall)

Independent research groups 
Organic Paleobiogeochemistry (Christian Hallmann)
Biospheric Theory and Modelling (Axel Kleidon)
Carbon Balance and Ecosystem Research (Ernst-Detlef Schulze)
Functional Biogeography (Christian Wirth & Jens Kattge)

External links 
 Homepage of the Max Planck Institute for Biogeochemistry

Laboratories in Germany
Biogeochemistry
Earth science research institutes
Research institutes established in 1997
Biogeochemistry